Andy Nichols (January 29, 1937 – April 19, 2001) was an American politician who served in the Arizona House of Representatives from the 13th district from 1993 to 2001 and in the Arizona Senate from the 13th district in 2001.

He died on April 19, 2001, in Phoenix, Arizona at age 64.

References

1937 births
2001 deaths
Democratic Party members of the Arizona House of Representatives
Democratic Party Arizona state senators
20th-century American politicians